The Costa das Algas Environmental Protection Area is an environmental protection area in the state of Espírito Santo, Brazil.

Location

The Costa das Algas Environmental Protection Area (APA) protects the coast and sea off the municipalities of Aracruz, Fundão and Serra, Espírito Santo.
The APA includes the shoreline, but 99% covers the sea.

History

The Costa das Algas Environmental Protection Area was created by federal decree on 17 June 2010.
It is administered by the Chico Mendes Institute for Biodiversity Conservation.
The APA became part of the Central Atlantic Forest Ecological Corridor, created later in 2002.
The consultative council was created on 23 November 2010.

Conservation

The APA is classed as IUCN protected area category V (protected landscape/seascape).
The purpose is to protect the biological diversity and natural environment, to ensure sustainable use of natural resources by coastal communities in the region and to promote recovery of vegetation in the coastal area.
The APA tries to protect and enhance the natural landscapes and scenic beauty by planning the process of occupation and land use on the sea front.
The Jurong Aracruz Shipyard has developed a program of environmental communication and education for the APA and the adjacent Santa Cruz Wildlife Refuge, with approval and monitoring by ICMBio and IEMA.

Notes

Sources

Environmental protection areas of Brazil
Protected areas of Espírito Santo
2010 establishments in Brazil